Marie Pierrette Sophie Pauline Ohier (13 October 1853 – 31 March 1941) was a French croquet player. She was born in Paris. She competed at the 1900 Summer Olympics in two events; not finishing in either the two ball singles or the one ball singles.

References

External links

1853 births
1941 deaths
Olympic croquet players of France
French croquet players
Croquet players at the 1900 Summer Olympics
Sportspeople from Paris